The 1873 Renfrewshire by-election was held on 10 September 1873.  The byelection was held due to the elevation to a peerage of the incumbent MP of the Liberal Party, Henry Bruce.  It was won by the Conservative candidate Archibald Campbell.

References

1873 in Scotland
1870s elections in Scotland
Politics of Renfrewshire
1873 elections in the United Kingdom
By-elections to the Parliament of the United Kingdom in Scottish constituencies
September 1873 events